José Luis Bustamante y Rivero District is one of the twenty-nine districts of the Arequipa Province in Peru.

References

Districts of the Arequipa Province
Districts of the Arequipa Region